This is a list of Monuments of National Importance (ASI) as officially recognized by and available through the website of the Archaeological Survey of India in the Indian state Tamil Nadu. The monument identifier is a combination of the abbreviation of the subdivision of the list (state, ASI circle) and the numbering as published on the website of the ASI. 413 Monuments of National Importance have been recognized by the ASI in Tamil Nadu.

List of monuments 
The list of Monuments of National Importance for Tamil Nadu is subdivided in two circles:
 Chennai
 List of Monuments of National Importance in Chennai circle
 List of Monuments of National Importance in Kanchipuram district
 List of Monuments of National Importance in Pudukkottai district
Thrissur
 List of Monuments of National Importance in Thrissur circle

See also 
 List of Monuments of National Importance in India for other Monuments of National Importance in India
 List of State Protected Monuments in Tamil Nadu

Footnotes and references 

Tamil Nadu